Macclesfield Bank is an elongated sunken atoll of underwater reefs and shoals in the South China Sea. It lies east of the Paracel Islands, southwest of Pratas Island and north of the Spratly Islands. With an ocean area of  it is one of the largest atolls of the world. The Macclesfield Bank is part of what China calls the Zhongsha Islands, which includes a number of geographically separate submarine features, and also refers to a county-level administrative division.

History 
Macclesfield banks reportedly were named after British ship named Macclesfield, though there is some ambiguity which vessel this was. By one account, the vessel was the British East India Company East Indiaman , which mapped and recorded the shoals in early 1701 on her way back to England from China. An alternate origin story attributes the name to an HMS Macclesfield that reportedly ran aground in the vicinity of these shoals in 1804.

In April 1888 , under the command of William Usborne Moore, with Percy Bassett-Smith as Surgeon-Naturalist, mapped the banks. They found a depth of  inside the bank, with the rim rising to within  of the surface. Dredging found live corals, showing that although entirely submerged, the bank was an actively growing reef.

Geography 
While the bank is everywhere submerged, with no drying shoals, it is usually visible due to the turbulence it causes, the seas becoming "high and confused" in heavy weather.

The elongated atoll consists of the following shoals, clockwise starting in the northeast, and at the end the six named shoals in the lagoon:

1 inside lagoon

Territorial claims 

Macclesfield Bank is claimed, in whole or in part, by China and Taiwan (Republic of China).

Some sources state that the Philippines claims this underwater feature. However, Jose Zaide, a Filipino diplomat of ambassadorial rank, has written that the Philippines does not claim the Macclesfield Bank. Moreover, Macclesfield Bank is not within UNCLOS 200 or Philippines EEZ.

As the bank is entirely underwater, some scholars have raised questions regarding the legality of territorial claims upon it with regards to the United Nations Convention on the Law of the Sea (UNCLOS). However, the Philippines filed claim for another underwater feature, the Benham Plateau, in 2008 in compliance with the requirements of UNCLOS and UN officially approved the claim in April 2012.

Notes

References

See also 
 Sansha
 Scarborough Shoal
 South China Sea

External links 
 Nautical Information
 ROC's home page
 Taiwanese List

Archipelagoes of the Pacific Ocean
Fishing areas of the South China Sea
Disputed reefs
Territorial disputes of China
Territorial disputes of the Republic of China
Lists of coordinates
Zhongsha Islands
Township-level divisions of Hainan
Reefs of the South China Sea
Atolls of the Pacific Ocean